James Williams (born 16 October 1966, in Huddersfield) is a Olympian and former champion fencer. He competed at the 1992 Olympic Games, 1996 Olympic Games and 2000 Olympic Games.

Biography
Williams started fencing when he joined the Army  and soon afterwards he won the Army Fencing Championship and Master of Arms competitions. In 1996 and 2000, he won the sabre title at the British Fencing Championships.

James was coached by Péter Fröhlich for a number of years, and together with Ian Williams they ran a summer training camp at Grantham in the UK. He is still involved at the top levels of fencing in Britain; he was the Team Manager for Team GB Fencing at the 2005 World Student Games in Izmir, Turkey and was responsible for Olympic Pathways and TASS program delivery, and is the Strength and Conditioning lead for GB Fencing. James coached at Sheffield Sword Club, where he was the principal coach until June 2010. James now coaches at City FC, MX Fencing and at Brentwood School.

International Competitions

References

External links
 Sport England - Sporting Champions profile
 British Fencing website
 Sheffield Sword Club website

1966 births
Living people
British male fencers
Fencers at the 1992 Summer Olympics
Fencers at the 1996 Summer Olympics
Fencers at the 2000 Summer Olympics
Olympic fencers of Great Britain
Sportspeople from Huddersfield